The  Central Islip State Hospital (CISH) Powerplant was constructed in 1953 by the Titusville Iron Works Co. and The Interboro Co.

It was constructed to meet the rising electrical demands of the expanding psychiatric facility located in Central Islip, New York on Long Island.

The Powerplant utilized 3 large turbine generators driven by steam created in 6 water tube boilers heated by coal, then eventually oil.
Both fuels were delivered by freight train. The steam that spun the generators was then funneled through a system of pipes housed in underground cement corridors to the various buildings on the psychiatric grounds for district heating.

The powerplant was known as Building number 101 and technically referred to as The Powerhouse. It was the last of 3 powerplants constructed on the psychiatric facility grounds and by far, the largest.

In the mid-1970s, a World War II Sherman Tank was discovered buried south of the Powerplant.

As deinstitutionalizing progressed across the United States and commercial powerplants on Long Island emerged, The CISH Powerplant was eventually relegated to the role of 
an electrical distribution hub for externally supplied electricity to the few remaining psychiatric buildings still in use.

In 1996, The Central Islip State Hospital was closed down and the property and buildings were sold to New York Tech.

New York Tech sold off the property on which the CISH Powerplant resided, and in 2006, it was demolished to make room for Condominiums.

References

External links

 Derfs Central Islip State Hospital Powerplant Site
Google Earth Central Islip State Hospital Powerplant satellite view
LI Oddities Central Islip State Hospital Powerplant photo section 

Energy infrastructure completed in 1953
Islip (town), New York
Former coal-fired power stations in the United States
Former oil-fired power stations in the United States
Coal-fired power stations in New York (state)
Oil-fired power stations in New York (state)
Former power stations in New York (state)
District heating in the United States